Kangkar Pulai is a village in the north of Mukim Pulai, Iskandar Puteri, Johor Bahru District, Johor, Malaysia. The township is bordered by Bandar Baru Kangkar Pulai to the north and west, and Taman Sri Pulai Perdana 2 to the north. The rest area on it perimeter are Palm Estates owned by Keck Seng Group.

History

Establishment
The first settlement in Kangkar Pulai was the Kangkar Pulai Old Town, a chinese village that was built under the Kangchu system that was introduced during the reign of Sultan Ibrahim.

Kangkar Pulai Municipal Council
Kangkar Pulai Municipal Council was established on 15 March 1953 with its first office at Jalan Kangkar Pulai. The office were moved to Chinese Business Assembly building two years later. After the independence of Malaya, the municipal council office was moved to the Kangkar Pulai Community Hall built by the government in 1959. On 1 March 1971, Kangkar Pulai Municipal Council and 7 other local authorities in Johor Bahru we amalgamated into Johor Bahru Tengah District Council, later known as Iskandar Puteri City Council in 2018.

Settlements

Kangkar Pulai Old Town
Kangkar Pulai Old Town was a chinese village and the first settlement in Kangkar Pulai. The town was named after this village. Many villagers are descendants of early Hakka settlers during Kangchu system introduced in Johor in early 20th century. There are also Indian settlers from descendants of Tamil workers at the nearby Palm Estates. During the First Communist Insurgency, the village is divided into 5 zones under the British resettlement program. Kangkar Pulai police station and rural clinic are located at this village.

The main article for this topic is Kangkar Pulai Old Town

Kampung Melayu Kangkar Pulai
This Malay village is opened in early 1950s by Malay settlers and located at the hilly area at the west of the old town. The major mosque in Kangkar Pulai, Masjid Nur Syuhadah is located at this village.

Taman Desa Permai
Taman Desa Permai is the first planned development in Kangkar Pulai. The development is located across the river south from old town and Malay Village. There are around 300 terrace houses and flat houses in this development.

Taman Bestari
Taman Bestari is the second development located south across the road between Site B and flat houses of Taman Desa Permai.

Geography
Kangkar Pulai is situated at the valley of Pulai River. The earth is hilly with fertile peat soil thus making it suitable for plantation. Gambier and black pepper used to be main agricultural product until they were being replaced by Palm estates due to high demand of palm oil in 1970.

See also
Iskandar Puteri
Pulai Mutiara, Johor
Pulai Indah, Johor
Pulai Hijauan, Johor
Bandar Baru Kangkar Pulai
Pekan Lama Kangkar Pulai

References

Iskandar Puteri
Towns and suburbs in Johor Bahru District